The diocese of Kabwe (in Latin: Dioecesis Kabvensis) is a diocese of the Roman Catholic Church located in Kabwe, Zambia.

Territory 
The diocese is composed of the following districts of the Central Province of Zambia: Chisamba, Kabwe, Kapiri Mposhi, Mkushi, Chibombo and Serenje.

The see is located in the city of Kabwe, where is located the cathedral of the Sacred Heart of Jesus.

The territory is divided into 31 parishes.

History 
The diocese was created on October 29, 2011 by the Papal bull Cum nuper of Pope Benedict XVI, taking territories of the dioceses of Mpika and Lusaka.

Bishops 
 Clement Mulenga, S.D.B., since October 29, 2011

Statistics 
At the date of creation, the diocese counted 138,810 baptized among a population of 1,078,334 people, which is 12.9%.

|-
| 2011 || 138.810 || 1.078.334 || 12,9 || 37 || 12 || 25 || 3.752 ||  || 25 || 70 || 17
|}

See also
Catholic Church in Zambia

References

External links 
 The diocese on Catholic-hierarchy.org 
 Notification of the creation of the diocese
 Bolla Cum nuper

Kabwe
Roman Catholic Diocese of Kabwe
Kabwe
Roman Catholic Ecclesiastical Province of Lusaka